Sanctuary is a 2022 American thriller film, directed by Zachary Wigon from a screenplay by Micah Bloomberg. It stars Christopher Abbott and Margaret Qualley.

It had its world premiere at the 2022 Toronto International Film Festival on September 11, 2022.

Plot
A wealthy client of a dominatrix tries to end their relationship.

Cast
 Christopher Abbott as Hal
 Margaret Qualley as Rebecca

Production
In September 2021, it was announced Christopher Abbott and Margaret Qualley had joined the cast of the film, with Zachary Wigon directing from a screenplay by Micah Bloomberg. Principal photography took place in New York City.

Release
It had its world premiere at the 2022 Toronto International Film Festival on September 11, 2022. Shortly after, Super acquired distribution rights to the film.

References

External links
 

2022 films
American thriller films
2020s American films
BDSM in films